Ivo the Genius is a  1995 Italian comedy drama film co-written, directed and starred by Alessandro Benvenuti.

Plot

Cast 

 Alessandro Benvenuti as Ivo
 Francesca Neri as  Sara
  Davide Bechini as  Fabio
  Francesco Casale as  Andrea 
  Vito  as Silvano
  Antonino Iuorio as  Antonio
 Sandro Lombardi  as Aldo
 Luca Fagioli 	 as Carlino 
 Sonia Grassi  as Delfina
 Daniele Trambusti  as Lele
 Maria Pelikan as Bruna
Lucia Ragni as Aunt Augusta 
 Guido Cerniglia as  Sara's father

See also   
 List of Italian films of 1995

References

External links

1995 films
1995 comedy-drama films
Italian comedy-drama films
Films about intellectual disability
Films directed by Alessandro Benvenuti
1990s Italian-language films
1990s Italian films